The 1934 Toronto Argonauts season was the 48th season for the team since the franchise's inception in 1873. The team finished tied for second place in the Big Four with a 3–2–1 record, failing by a single point to qualify for the playoffs and defend their 1933 Grey Cup championship.

Preseason
In the fourth annual City Championship preseason competition, the Argos reached the final and defeated St. Michael's College to claim the Reg DeGruchy Memorial Trophy for the third straight year.

Regular season

Standings

Schedule

References

Toronto Argonauts seasons